The Far Side Gallery 5 is the fifth and final anthology of Gary Larson's The Far Side comic strips. Cartoons from previous collections Cows of Our Planet, The Chickens are Restless, and The Curse of Madame "C" are featured, all of which were printed from 1992 to 1994. The foreword was written by Jane Goodall, who was commonly satirized in Larson's comics. The cover shows several flies in a movie theater watching a movie, in which a fly was calling for help because it was in a spoonful of tomato soup about to be swallowed by a person.

1995 books
The Far Side